Bolton Low Houses is a small village in the Allerdale borough of Cumbria, England. There is a coal mining area to the east between Oughterside, Allhallows Colliery and Bolton No.2 Pit. In 1831, Samuel Lewis noted that there was a meeting house for dissenters in Bolton Low Houses. It contains a Methodist Chapel and a pub, the Oddfellows Arms.

See also
List of places in Cumbria
Bolton New Houses

References

Villages in Cumbria
Allerdale